The Rare Disease Act of 2002 is a law passed in the United States that establishes the statutory authorization for the Office of Rare Diseases as a federal entity able to recommend a national research agenda, coordinate research, and provide educational activities for researchers.

Background
A rare disease or disorder is defined in the U.S. as one affecting fewer than 200,000 Americans. There are more than 6,000 known rare diseases, and it is estimated that about 25 million Americans are affected by them (as of 2002).

Prior to the RDA was the Orphan Drug Act of 1983 which was designed to facilitate the development and commercialization of drugs to treat rare diseases, termed orphan drugs. This act however did not provide for the creation of a centralized structure able to coordinate research or recommend agendas that would better facilitate research and education.

Legislative history
S. 1379 (Rare Diseases Act of 2001) was introduced in 2001 by Sen. Edward Kennedy (D-MA) but died in committee. H.R 4013 was introduced by Rep. John Shimkus (R-IL) on May 20, 2002 and had 54 co-sponsors.

It was signed into law on November 6, 2002.

Provisions
It establishes the Office of Rare Diseases under the National Institutes of Health.

The law provided for a total of $24,000,000 in annual funding between 2003–2006.

Impact
The NIH established the Rare Diseases Clinical Research Network in 2003 with a $51 million grant over five years in response to the law.

The network consists of seven Rare Diseases Clinical Research Centers (RDCRCs) and a Data and Technology Coordinating Center (DTCC).

According to Stephen Groft, Pharm.D., director of NIH's Office of Rare Diseases "The network will facilitate increased collaboration and data sharing between investigators and patient support groups working to improve the lives of those affected by these diseases and potentially prevent or eliminate these diseases in the future."

The RDCRC's will be able to utilize the resources available at the 82 General Clinical Research Centers distributed across the United States. Since the program’s launch, nearly 29,000 participants have been enrolled in RDCRC clinical studies. As of October 2014, the network is composed of around 2,600 researchers which includes NIH staff, academic investigators and members of 98 patient advocacy groups. There are 91 studies underway.

For fiscal year 2014, the NIH awarded a total of $29 million to expand the Rare Diseases Clinical Research Network and study 200 rare diseases.

See also
National Institutes of Health
Orphan drugs
Rare Disease Day
National Organization for Rare Disorders

References

External links
 Text of the Rare Diseases Act of 2002
 NIH Office of Rare Diseases Research

National Institutes of Health
Rare diseases
Acts of the 107th United States Congress
United States federal health legislation